A May Kyay Zu Satt Phu Chin Tal is a 2010 Burmese drama film, directed by Khin Saw Myo (A Phay Pyinnyar) starring Pyay Ti Oo, Thet Mon Myint, Nay Aung and May Than Nu.

Cast
Pyay Ti Oo as Ko Ko Zaw, Moe Htet Zaw (dual role)
Thet Mon Myint as Aye Aye Moe
Nay Aung as U Thite Htun
May Than Nu as Daw Khin Khin Swe
Min Thu as Htun Maung
Hla Inzali Tint as Rosie
Aung Khine as Myint Oo
Wah Wah Aung as mother of Aye Aye Moe
Ei Si Kway (Child actor) as Moe Htet Zaw

Award

References

2010 films
2010s Burmese-language films
Burmese drama films
Films shot in Myanmar